Ivan José Macachyba Dias (born 8 April 1919, date of death unknown), known as just Ivan, was a Brazilian footballer. He played in four matches for the Brazil national football team in 1946. He was also part of Brazil's squad for the 1946 South American Championship.

References

External links
 

1919 births
Year of death missing
Brazilian footballers
Brazil international footballers
Place of birth missing
Association footballers not categorized by position